Rua Augusta is a Brazilian drama television series based on the Israeli series "Allenby St." that premiered on TNT Brazil on March 15, 2018. It is the first Brazilian original series released by TNT in a co-production with O2 Filmes. It is directed by Pedro Morelli and Fábio Mendonça, and written by Ana Reber, Jaqueline Vargas and Julia Furrer.

The series brings as main scenario the underground culture and prostitution in Rua Augusta, one of the most emblematic streets of the city of São Paulo.

Premise 
The narrative accompanies the story of Mika (Fiorella Mattheis), who works as a stripper at the nightclub Love. In this bustling scenario, she builds a relatively normal life and hides facts from her past. Throughout the series, she will have a loving involvement and develop a great partnership with Alex (Lourinelson Vladmir), who is the manager at the Hell nightclub.

Cast
 Fiorella Mattheis as	Mika
 Pathy de Jesus as	Nicole
 Rodrigo Pandolfo as	Emílio
 Milhem Cortaz as	Raul
 Lourinelson Vladmir as	Alex
 Zemanuel Pinheiro as	Cézar
 Glamour Garcia as	Babete
 Rui Ricardo as	Dimas
 Carlos Meceni as	Maurício Amaral
 Rafael Dib as	Lucas

Release
The series premiered on TNT Brazil on March 15, 2018. The streaming service Amazon Prime Video purchased rights to broadcast the series in Latin America.

References

External links
 

2018 Brazilian television series debuts
2010s Brazilian television series
Brazilian drama television series
Portuguese-language television shows
Prostitution in Brazilian television
Television shows filmed in São Paulo (state)
Television shows set in São Paulo
Brazilian television series based on Israeli television series